Sunrize Band are a rock band from the Northern Territory.

Sunrize Band are from the remote community of Maningrida in the Arnhem Land and were the first band signed to Triple-J's record label. At the National Indigenous Music Awards 2012, they were inducted into the Indigenous Music Hall of Fame.

Discography
Albums
Check It Out! – Let's Dance (1990)
 Sunset to rize! (1992)
 Lunggurrma (1993) - ABC Music

Singles
"Lembana Mani Mani" - ABC Music

References

External links
Sunrize Band : programs and related material collected by the National Library of Australia

Northern Territory musical groups
Indigenous Australian musical groups